Ain't Misbehavin' is a musical revue with a book by Murray Horwitz and Richard Maltby Jr., and music by various composers and lyricists as arranged and orchestrated by Luther Henderson.  It is named after the song by Fats Waller (with Harry Brooks and Andy Razaf), "Ain't Misbehavin'".

The musical is a tribute to the music of Fats Waller. It was a time when Manhattan nightclubs such as the Cotton Club and the Savoy Ballroom were the playgrounds of high society and Lenox Avenue dives were filled with piano players banging out the new beat known as swing. Five performers present an evening of rowdy, raunchy, and humorous songs that encapsulate the various moods of the era and reflect Waller's view of life as a journey meant for pleasure and play.

Productions
Ain't Misbehavin opened in the Manhattan Theatre Club's East 73rd Street cabaret on February 8, 1978. The cast included Irene Cara, Nell Carter, André DeShields, Armelia McQueen, and Ken Page and was staged by Arthur Faria,  now recognized as one of the original authors, and directed by Maltby. The New York Times reviewer wrote: "The show moves with the zing and sparkle of a Waller recording-filled with bright melodies and asides." Its reception was such that it was decided to develop it into a full-scale production.

The musical opened on Broadway at the Longacre Theatre on May 9, 1978, and transferred to the Plymouth Theatre and then to the Belasco Theatre and closed on February 21, 1982, after 1,604 performances and fourteen previews. Maltby was the director, with musical staging and choreography by Arthur Faria. The original cast featured Nell Carter, André DeShields, Armelia McQueen, Ken Page, and Charlayne Woodard. Luther Henderson, who adapted Waller's music for the revue, appeared as the production's original pianist. Replacements later in the run included Debbie Allen, Yvette Freeman, Adriane Lenox, and Alan Weeks. An original cast recording was released by RCA Victor.

The London West End production opened on March 22, 1979, at Her Majesty's Theatre. DeShields and Woodard were joined by Evan Bell, Annie Joe Edwards, and Jozella Reed. It was revived in London in 1995 at the Tricycle Theatre and then the Lyric Theatre, with Debby Bishop, Dawn Hope, Melanie Marshall, Sean Palmer, and Ray Shell.  A London revival cast recording was released by First Night.

On June 21, 1982, NBC broadcast the revue with the original Broadway cast.

A Broadway revival with the same director, choreographer, and cast as the original 1978 production opened on August 15, 1988, at the Ambassador Theatre, where it ran for 176 performances and eight previews. Frank Rich, in his review for The New York Times, wrote "In their scrupulous re-creation of the Fats Waller show that first electrified Broadway a decade ago, the original cast and creators have conjured the same between-the-wars dream world as before... Though almost bereft of dialogue, this musical anthology expands beyond its form to become a resurrection of a great black artist's soul. Perhaps the key to the musical's approach, as conceived by the director Richard Maltby Jr., is its willingness to let Waller speak simply and eloquently for himself, through his art but without show-biz  embroidery."

In 1995, a national tour directed and choreographed by Faria starred the Pointer Sisters, Eugene Barry-Hill, and Michael-Leon Wooley. Although it never reached Broadway as originally planned, a recording of highlights from the show was released by RCA.

Beginning in November 2008 and lasting until at least May 2009, season two American Idol contestants Frenchie Davis,  Trenyce Cobbins and winner Ruben Studdard starred in the 30th anniversary national tour of the show.

Song list

Act I
Ain't Misbehavin'
Lookin' Good but Feelin' Bad
Tain't Nobody's Biz-ness if I Do
Honeysuckle Rose
Squeeze Me
Handful of Keys
I've Got a Feeling I'm Falling
How Ya Baby
Jitterbug Waltz
Ladies Who Sing with the Band
Yacht Club Swing
When the Nylons Bloom Again
Cash for Your Trash
Off-Time
The Joint is Jumpin'

Act II
Spreadin' Rhythm Around
Lounging at the Waldorf
The Viper's Drag
Mean to Me
Your Feet's Too Big
That Ain't Right
Keepin' Out of Mischief Now
Find Out What They Like
Fat and Greasy
Black and Blue
I'm Gonna Sit Right Down and Write Myself a Letter
Two Sleepy People
I've Got my Fingers Crossed
I Can't Give You Anything but Love
It's a Sin to Tell a Lie
Honeysuckle Band

Awards and nominations

Original Broadway production

Original London production

1982 NBC broadcast

1988 Broadway revival

30th anniversary revival tour

Notes

External links

Ain't Misbehavin at the Music Theatre International website
Ovrtur.com Page

1978 musicals
Broadway musicals
All-Black cast Broadway shows
Drama Desk Award-winning musicals
The Muppets songs
Jukebox musicals
Sung-through musicals
Tony Award for Best Musical
Revues
Tony Award-winning musicals